Vakoc or Vakoč is a surname. Notable people with the surname include:

 Christopher Vakoc, American molecular biologist
 Petr Vakoč (born 1992), Czech cyclist
 Tim Vakoc (1960–2009), American priest